Nika Zorjan (born 3 December 1992) is a Slovenian singer and songwriter. Zorjan began her music career in 2010 as a contestant on the first season of Slovenija ima talent, the Slovenian version of Got Talent, later signing with Raay Music, the record label of Slovene duo Maraaya. She made her debut in 2012 with the single "Čas za nas", which was written by Maraaya. She later released the single "Nasmeh življenja" in 2013, which went on to become one of the most-played singles on Slovenian radio of the year in 2013 and 2014.

Zorjan has attempted to represent Slovenia in the Eurovision Song Contest on three occasions; in 2012, 2017, and 2018. She also performed as a backing vocalist for the Slovenian act in 2014 and 2015.

Early life
Nika Zorjan was born on the 3rd of December 1992 in Petanjci, a small village near the city of Murska Sobota. She grew up in a musical family, with her grandfather Leopold playing the accordion, and her father Janez playing guitar in the Slovenian band Nova Legija.

Career
Zorjan began her career in 2010, after becoming a contestant on the first season of Slovenija ima talent, the Slovenian version of Got Talent, but did not place as a semifinalist. In 2012, she began taking part in Misija Evrovizija, where she placed third behind Eva Boto and Nika & Eva Prusnik. After competing, she was signed by Raay to his record label Raay Music. She released her debut single "Čas za nas" that year, which went on to become a success in Slovenia, being nominated for the 2012 Eurodanceweb Award for Slovenia. Her follow-up single "Problemom sredinc" was released later that same year.

In 2014, Zorjan was a backing singer at the Eurovision Song Contest 2014, performing with Tinkara Kovač. She later competed at EMA 2017, attempting to represent Slovenia in the Eurovision Song Contest 2017 with the song "Fse". She placed fifth overall. Zorjan also competed in EMA 2018 with the song "Uspavanka", but did not qualify to the final.

Zorjan often sings also in Prekmurje Slovene.

Discography

Singles

Featured

Other charted songs

Notes

References

1992 births
Living people
21st-century Slovenian women singers
Slovenian pop singers
Slovenian songwriters
People from the Municipality of Tišina
People from Murska Sobota
Prekmurje Slovenes